Brigade Enterprises Limited is a real estate and property development company that is based in Bengaluru, Karnataka, India. The Brigade Group also has operations in Mangalore, Mysore, Chennai, Kochi, Hyderabad, Chikmagalur, Ahmedabad and a representative office in Dubai.  It has won national and international awards in the construction industry. It was founded by M.R.Nagraj in the year 1986.

Brigade Group provides property management services, hospitality and education across several major cities in South India. The group also owns Brigade Foundation, which is a not-for-profit trust.

Projects and History

The Brigade Group has Brigade International Finance Centre in Gujarat International Finance Tec-City and has built World Trade Center Bangalore, World Trade Center Chennai and World Trade Center, Kochi. 
Brigade holds the WTCA licenses for all the major South Indian cities.

References

External links
 
Brigade LinkedIn

Companies based in Bangalore
Real estate companies of India
Indian companies established in 1986
1986 establishments in Karnataka
Companies listed on the National Stock Exchange of India
Companies listed on the Bombay Stock Exchange